Yuan Kewen (Chinese: 袁克文; 1889–1931) was a Chinese scholar and calligrapher.
Yuan's courtesy name was Baocen (豹岑). Yuan is also known by the sobriquet Hanyun (寒云).

Early life 
In 1889, Yuan was born. Yuan's father was Yuan Shikai, a Chinese military and government officer during the late Qing Dynasty and the Emperor of China until 1916. Yuan's mother was Lady Kim (金氏), his father's third concubine and a Korean born in Seoul. Yuan's elder brother was Yuan Keding.

Career 
Yuan was an expert of Chinese traditional literature and a master of calligraphy and Chinese ink painting. He excelled in poetry and lyrics and was obsessed in collecting fine arts and antiques. He was against his father's revival of monarchy and also lived a promiscuous life, which irritated his father. Yuan fled to Shanghai and joined a gang of thugs. He recruited many disciples in Shanghai and Tianjin.

Personal life 
Yuan married Liu Meizhen (刘梅真). In addition to his wife, Yuan had five concubines, Qingyunlou, Xiaotaohong, Tang Zhijun, Yu Peiwen, and Yaxian. Yuan also had numerous mistresses.

Yuan had four sons and three daughters, and all of them were scholars. Yuan's third son, Yuan Jialiu（袁家騮), was a renowned high energy physicist. Jialiu's wife was Chien-Shiung Wu, a prominent nuclear physicist.
In 1931, Yuan died in Tianjin.

He is also known for research in Paper Tiger game and he wrote《雀谱》.

See also
Three perfections - integration of calligraphy, poetry and painting

References

1889 births
1931 deaths
Chinese people of Korean descent
Tabletop game writers